The Wave Blaster was an add-on MIDI-synthesizer for Creative Sound Blaster 16 and Sound Blaster AWE32 family of PC soundcards.  It was a sample-based synthesis General MIDI compliant synthesizer.  For General MIDI scores, the Wave Blaster's wavetable-engine produced more realistic instrumental music than the SB16's onboard Yamaha-OPL3.

The Wave Blaster attached to a SB16 through a 26-pin expansion-header, eliminating the need for extra cabling between the SB16 and the Wave Blaster.  The SB16 emulated an MPU-401 UART, giving existing MIDI-software the option to send MIDI-sequences directly to the attached Wave Blaster, instead of driving an external MIDI-device.  The Wave Blaster's analog stereo-output fed into a dedicated line-in on the SB16, where the onboard-mixer allowed equalization, mixing, and volume adjustment.

The Wave Blaster port was adopted by other sound card manufacturers who produced both daughterboards and soundcards with the expansion-header: Diamond, Ensoniq, Guillemot, Oberheim, Orchid, Roland, TerraTec, Turtle Beach, and Yamaha.  The header also appeared on devices such as the Korg NX5R MIDI sound module, the Oberheim MC-1000/MC-2000 keyboards, and the TerraTec Axon AX-100 Guitar-to-MIDI converter.

Since 2000, Wave Blaster-capable sound cards for computers are becoming rare.  In 2005, Terratec released a new Wave Blaster daughterboard called the Wave XTable with 16mb of on-board sample memory comprising 500 instruments and 10 drum kits. In 2014, a new compatible card called Dreamblaster S1 was produced by the Belgian company Serdaco. In 2015 that same company released a high end card named Dreamblaster X1, comparable to Yamaha and Roland cards. In 2016 DreamBlaster X2 was released, a board with both waveblaster interface and USB interface.

WaveBlaster II
Creative released the Waveblaster II (CT1910) shortly after the original Waveblaster.  Waveblaster II used a newer E-mu EMU8000 synthesis-engine (which later appeared in the AWE32).

By the time the SB16 reached the height of its popularity, competing MIDI-daughterboards had already pushed aside the Waveblaster.  In particular, Roland's Sound Canvas daughterboards (SCD-10/15), priced higher than Creative's offering, were highly regarded for their unrivalled musical reproduction in MIDI-scored game titles. (This was due to Roland's dominance in the production aspect of the MIDI game soundtracks; Roland's daughterboards shared the same synthesis-engine and instrument sound-set as the popular Sound Canvas 55, a commercial MIDI module favored by game composers.)  By comparison, the WaveBlaster's instruments were improperly balanced, with many instruments striking at different volume-levels (relative to the de facto standard, Sound Canvas.)

Reception
Computer Gaming World in 1993 praised the Wave Blaster's audio quality and stated that the card was the best wave-table synthesis device for those with a compatible sound card.

WaveBlaster Connector Pinout

AGnd = Analog ground
DGnd = Digital ground
Some Wave Blaster cards offer audio inputs ( Yamaha DB50XG )
Some Wave Blaster cards offer TTL-MIDI output
Reset is active low

References

External links
 Waveblaster pin-out information
 Waveblaster card photos (text in Japanese)
 Waveblaster Card Collection
 2014 Dreamblaster Module
 2015 dreamblaster X1 review
 dreamblaster X1 vs Yamaha vs Roland

IBM PC compatibles
Computer peripherals
Creative Technology products
Sound cards